The Djupedalshausane Peaks are a group of peaks between the heads of Lunde Glacier and Djupedalen Valley in the Mühlig-Hofmann Mountains, Queen Maud Land. They were mapped by Norwegian cartographers from surveys and air photos by the Sixth Norwegian Antarctic Expedition (1956–60) and named Djupedalshausane (the deep valley peaks).

References 

Mountains of Queen Maud Land
Princess Astrid Coast